Ben Albritton (born August 17, 1968) is a Republican politician and a former member of the Florida House of Representatives, representing the 56th District, which includes DeSoto County, Hardee County, and southwestern Polk County, from 2012 to 2018. Albritton previously represented the 66th District from 2010 to 2012.

History

Albritton was born in Lakeland and attended Florida Southern College, where he received a degree in citrus in 1990. Following graduation, he joined his family's citrus grove company, working with his brother and his uncle. Albritton served on the Peace River Valley Citrus Growers Association Board from 2002 to 2007, and in 2005, he was appointed to the Florida Citrus Commission by Governor Jeb Bush, where he served until 2010 following reappointment by Governor Charlie Crist, including a tenure as Chairman from 2007 to 2010. Additionally, Albritton served on the East Charlotte County Drainage District as a board member.

Florida House of Representatives
When incumbent State Representative Baxter Troutman was unable to seek re-election in 2010 due to term limits, Albritton ran to succeed him in the 66th District, which included Hardee County, southern Polk County, and northwestern Highlands County. He faced Chevon Baccus in the Republican primary, whom he significantly outraised, eventually defeating her with 79% of the vote. In the general election, he faced only a write-in opponent, whom he defeated with 99% of the vote. Following his election, Albritton indicated that he intended to run to be Speaker of the Florida House of Representatives for the 2016-2018 session, but he lost out to Richard Corcoran.

In 2012, when the state legislative districts were reconfigured, Albritton was moved to the 56th District, which included most of the territory that he represented in the 66th District. He faced no opposition in the primary or general elections and won his second term entirely uncontested. Albritton was re-elected to his third term in the legislature without opposition in 2014.

Florida Senate 
Albritton was elected to the Florida Senate in 2018.

References

External links
Florida House of Representatives - Ben Albritton

1968 births
21st-century American politicians
Citrus farmers from Florida
Florida Southern College alumni
Living people
People from Lakeland, Florida
Republican Party members of the Florida House of Representatives